Seidel's sign (also called Seidel's scotoma) is a sickle-shaped scotoma that is a superior or inferior extension of the blind spot. It occurs in some patients with glaucoma.

History
In 1914, German ophthalmologist Erich Seidel first described the glaucomatous visual field defect, Seidel's scotoma.

References 

Medical signs
Ophthalmology